Verkh-Gondyr is a rural locality (a village) in Bolshegondryskoye Rural Settlement, Kuyedinsky District, Perm Krai, Russia. The population was 234 as of 2010. There are 3 streets.

Geography 
Verkh-Gondyr is located 23 km southwest of Kuyeda (the district's administrative centre) by road. Bolshoy Gondyr is the nearest rural locality.

References 

Rural localities in Kuyedinsky District